Seaton, Cumbria is a civil parish in the Borough of Allerdale in Cumbria, England.  It contains fourlisted buildings that are recorded in the National Heritage List for England.  All the listed buildings are designated at Grade II, the lowest of the three grades, which is applied to "buildings of national importance and special interest".  The parish contains the village of Seaton, and all the listed buildings are houses, two with attached outbuildings, and one that originated as the lodge to a country house.


Buildings

References

Citations

Sources

Lists of listed buildings in Cumbria
Seaton, Cumbria